Tsarabaria is a town and commune in northern Madagascar. It belongs to the district of Vohemar, which is a part of Sava Region. The population of the commune was estimated to be approximately 20,000 in 2001 commune census.

Primary and junior level secondary education are available. It is also a site of industrial-scale  mining. The majority 99% of the population of the commune are farmers.  The most important crops are coffee and vanilla, while other important agricultural products are beans and rice.  Industry provides employment for 0.9% of the population. Additionally fishing employs 0.1% of the population.

Geography
The town is situated at the Route nationale 5a between Vohemar and Sambava.

References and notes 

Populated places in Sava Region